Mithridates or Mithradates was a Persian noble. His wife was the daughter of Darius III with the sister of Pharnaces, which made him the son-in-law of Darius. He was slain by the hand of Alexander the Great himself, at the Battle of the Granicus (modern-day Turkey) in 334 BC, when Alexander plunged his lance through Mithridates' face.

References

Sources
Smith, William (editor); Dictionary of Greek and Roman Biography and Mythology, "Mithridates (5)", Boston, (1867)

334 BC deaths
Opponents of Alexander the Great
Military leaders of the Achaemenid Empire
Military personnel of the Achaemenid Empire killed in action
Year of birth unknown
4th-century BC Iranian people
Darius III